Uladzislau Viktaravich Smiahlikau (born 5 April 1993) is a Belarusian boxer. He competed in the men's heavyweight event at the 2020 Summer Olympics.

References

External links
 

1993 births
Living people
Belarusian male boxers
Olympic boxers of Belarus
Boxers at the 2020 Summer Olympics
People from Dobruš District
Boxers at the 2019 European Games
European Games medalists in boxing
European Games silver medalists for Belarus
Sportspeople from Gomel Region
21st-century Belarusian people